Emarat (also Romanized as ‘Emārat) is a village in Rostam-e Do Rural District, in the Central District of Rostam County, Fars Province, Iran. At the 2006 census, its population was 134, in 28 families.

References 

Populated places in Rostam County